In philosophy, a grouped event is the experience of two or more events that occur in sequence or concurrently that can be subsequently categorized.

Description 
Grouped events can fall into categories depending upon whether the events are causal or acausal (noncausal), and are with or without meaning (significance). Causal events are related as the subsequent event(s) are understood to be a consequence of the prior event(s).
Meaning represents the purpose or significance of something.

Four categories are causality, coincidence, serendipity, and synchronicity.

Causality represents causal events grouped without meaning. These are common events.

Coincidence represents acausal events grouped without meaning. These are less common events.

Serendipity represents causal events grouped by meaning. These are rare events.

Synchronicity represents acausal events grouped by meaning. These events are unlikely to occur by chance and may represent an outlier effect.

Examples 
A causality example is to strike a cue ball with a pool stick to make it move. The result is expected and has no meaning.

A coincidence example is two friends from the same town finding each other at the same time in the town's library without any planning. The result is unexpected, yet has no meaning (significance).

A serendipity example is finding something useful while looking for something else, such as finding the cue ball while looking for the pool stick. The find was caused by the search, and because the find was useful, the event has meaning.

A sychronicity example is two friends who rarely visit libraries, without any planning, finding each other in a library on one day; and again without any planning, finding each other in a distant library on a later date. Not only is the result unexpected, the friends find the event to have meaning (significance), because of the remote chance of the event.

Criticisms and interpretations 
Determinism theory argues against acausal events. However, the idea of causal determinism can neither be argued for nor against based on the scientific knowledge at this point in time .

Causality appears to us to be reasonably objective to determine on the macroscopic scale. (But not on the quantum scale, where random chance prevails.) However, even large-scale physical causality is a somewhat mysterious notion; there is no general theory of causality in physics, and most events in physics are theoretically reversible in time . However, the Second Law of Thermodynamics (which states that entropy always increases with time, in any closed system) can be regarded as providing a direction for the "arrow of time" and thus entropy may be related to the physically mysterious notion of causality. (See Causality (physics).)

Unlike causality, the concept of meaning is purely subjective except in symbol systems such as language/grammar and mathematics – both systems which depend on prior agreement on the arbitrary assignment of specific meanings to specific symbols or symbol groups..

The outlier effect can be used to explain events that are unlikely to occur by chance. Littlewood's Law states that individuals can statistically expect a significant event to happen for them at a frequency of about once per month. Littlewood assumes a significant event frequency at one in a million with a duration of one second, and that an individual is alert to significant events for eight hours per day.

In popular culture 
The 1993 book The Celestine Prophecy by James Redfield encouraged its readers to seek meaning from grouped events. From the book's First Insight: "In each of our lives occurs mysterious coincidences – sudden, synchronistic events that, once interpreted, lead us into our true destiny'. The book was a 1996 best seller, spent 165 weeks on The New York Times Bestseller list, and has now sold over 20 million copies.

See also 
 Causality
 Coincidence
 Serendipity
 Synchromysticism
 Synchronicity
 Meaning (non-linguistic)
 Outlier
 Littlewood's law
 Determinism

References

Further reading
 Jung, Carl (1972). Synchronicity, An Acausal Connecting Principle. Routledge and Kegan Paul. .
 Cederquist, Jan (2010). Meaningful Coincidence. Times Publishing Limited. .
 Faust, David (1984). The Limits of Scientific Reasoning. University of Minnesota Press. .

External links
 Metaphysics of Causation, Stanford Encyclopedia of Philosophy
 Psychology Today, May 2010 article on Serendipity

Concepts in epistemology
Causality
Synchronicity